The Sakiz is a carpet wool breed of sheep also kept for meat and milk production. They can be found in the region surrounding Izmir in Turkey.

The males are horned.

References 

Sheep breeds
Sheep breeds originating in Turkey